Bani Omar is a sub-district located in Yarim District, Ibb Governorate, Yemen. Bani Omar had a population of 10914 as of  2004.

References 

Sub-districts in Yarim District